This is a list of notable events in music that took place in the year 1735.

Events
January 12 – Death of British composer John Eccles; he is succeeded as  Master of the King's Musick by Maurice Greene.
February 18 – John Hippisley's English ballad opera Flora becomes the first opera performed in the United States – at Charleston, South Carolina.
April 8 – Johann Sebastian Bach revives the anonymous St Luke Passion BWV 246 (BC D 6) at St. Nicholas Church, Leipzig.
October 25 – Death of Charles Mordaunt, 3rd Earl of Peterborough; shortly before this he has acknowledged opera singer Anastasia Robinson as his wife.

Popular music
Richard Leveridge – "The Roast Beef of Old England"

Classical music
Carl Philipp Emanuel Bach 
Flute Sonata in G major, H.550
Trio Sonata in A minor, H.572
Johann Sebastian Bach
Concerto nach italienischen Gusto
Overture nach französischer Art
Wilhelm Friedemann Bach 
3 Fugues for Organ with Pedal
Harpsichord Concerto in D major, F.41
Jean-Baptiste Barrière – 6 Cello Sonatas, Book II
Antonio Caldara – Gesù presentato nel tempio
Louis-Claude Daquin – Pièces de Clavecin
Johann Friedrich Fasch – Oboe Concerto, FaWV L:d2
Francesco Geminiani – 6 Concerti Grossi after Corelli's Trio Sonatas
Christoph Graupner 
Trio Sonata in C major, GWV 202
Trio Sonata in B-flat major, GWV 217
Bassoon Concerto in C major, GWV 301
 Maurice Greene – Lesson in F major, G minor
Johann Adolph Hasse 
Miserere in C minor
6 Trio Sonatas, Op. 2
 George Frideric Handel 
 Organ Concerto in G minor, HWV 289
 Organ Concerto in F major, HWV 292
Pietro Antonio Locatelli – 6 Introduttioni teatrali e 6 Concerti grossi, Op. 4
Jean-Joseph Cassanéa de Mondonville – 6 Violin Sonatas, Op. 4 'Les sons harmoniques'
Giovanni Batista Pergolesi – Orfeo, P.115 (secular cantata)
Nicola Porpora – 12 Cantate da camera (Dedicated: All' Altezza reale di Federico Prencipe reale di Vallia)
Johann Christian Schickhardt – L'Alphabet de la Musique, Op. 30
Georg Philipp Telemann 
12 Fantasias for Viol without Bass, TWV 40:26–37 (Hamburg: [Telemann])
6 Sonates corellisantes, for two violins or flutes and basso continuo (Hamburg: [Telemann])
Lorenzo Gaetano Zavateri – 12 Concerti, Op. 1
Jan Dismas Zelenka – Gesù al Calvario (oratorio)

Opera
Antonio Caldara – Scipione Africano
Egidio Romualdo Duni – Nerone
François Francœur and François Rebel – Scanderberg
George Frideric Handel
Ariodante, HWV 33 (first performed)
Alcina, HWV 34
Atalanta, HWV 35 (composed, performed 1736)
 Johann Adolf Hasse – Tito Vespasiano
Leonardo Leo – Demofoonte (in collaboration with Giuseppe Sellitto, Francesco Mancini and Domenico Sarro)
Giovanni Battista Pergolesi 
Il Flaminio
L'Olimpiade (first performed, composed 1734)
Nicola Antonio Porpora
Ifigenia In Aulide
Polifemo
Jean-Philippe Rameau – Les Indes galantes (opéra-ballet)
Francesco Maria Veracini – Adriano In Siria
Antonio Vivaldi 
Adelaide, RV 695 (lost)
Bajazet, RV 703 (Pasticcio with music by Riccardo Broschi, Geminiano Giacomelli and Johann Adolph Hasse)
Griselda, RV 718

Publications 

 George Frideric Handel – 6 Fugues, HWV 605–610
 Reinhard Keiser – Dialogus von der Geburt Christi
 Johann Mattheson – Die wol-klingende Finger-Sprache (Hamburg: Composer)
 Georg Philipp Telemann – Fugierende und verändernde Choräle, TWV 31:1–48

Methods and Theory Writings 

 Johann Mattheson – Kleine General-Baß-Schule

Births
January 21 – Johann Gottfried Eckard, pianist and composer (died 1809) 
February 25 – Ernst Wilhelm Wolf, composer (died 1792)
February 28 – Alexandre-Théophile Vandermonde, musician, mathematician and chemist (died 1796) 
May 13 – Horace Coignet, composer (died 1821)
June 1 – James Lyon I (died 1794)
June 6 – Anton Schweitzer, opera composer (died 1787)
July 10 – Giovanni Bertati (died 1815)
September 5 – Johann Christian Bach, composer (died 1782)
October 30 – Edward Miller (died 1807)
November 17 – Antoine Alexandre Henri Poinsinet (died 1769)
November 26 – Giambattista Varesco, priest, musician, poet and librettist (died 1805)
date unknown
Charlotte Brent, operatic soprano (died 1802)
Franz Anton Spitzeder, operatic tenor and keyboard teacher (died 1796)

Deaths
January 12 – John Eccles, composer (born 1668)
January 29 – George Granville (born 1666)
February 27 – John Arbuthnot (born 1667)
March 24 – Georg Friedrich Kaufmann, organist and composer (born 1679)
June 22 – Pirro Albergati, aristocrat and amateur composer (born 1663)
July 18 – Johann Krieger, organist and composer (born 1649)
November 2 – Šimon Brixi, composer (born 1693)
date unknown 
Quirino Colombani, musician, composer and music teacher (date of birth unknown)
Jean-Nicolas de Francine, director of the Opéra national de Paris (born 1662)

 
18th century in music
Music by year